Albert Bramlett Neil (1873, Lewisburg, Tennessee – June 26, 1966) was a justice of the Tennessee Supreme Court from 1942 to 1960.

Life
He attended Winchester Normal College, and graduated from Cumberland University.

In 1911, he married Josephine Pendleton.

References

External links 
 NEIL, ALBERT BRAMLETT, SR. (1873-1966) PAPERS, 1917-1966, Tennessee State Library and Archives

Justices of the Tennessee Supreme Court
1873 births
1966 deaths
Cumberland University alumni
People from Lewisburg, Tennessee